The 70th Anniversary Grand Prix (officially known as the Emirates Formula 1 70th Anniversary Grand Prix 2020) was a one-off Formula One motor race held on 9 August 2020 at the Silverstone Circuit in Silverstone, United Kingdom, the second of two back to back races at the venue, after the 2020 British Grand Prix seven days earlier. The race was the fifth round of the rescheduled 2020 Formula One World Championship. It was held as a 70-year commemoration race of the first Formula One World Championship race which was held at the same circuit in 1950.

The race was won by Red Bull-Honda driver Max Verstappen. This was the first non-Mercedes victory in 2020, the first victory for Red Bull at Silverstone in the 1.6 litre V6 turbo hybrid engine era and their first win at the venue since the 2012 British Grand Prix (won by Mark Webber), and the first Honda-powered win at the track since the 1989 British Grand Prix. At this race, runner-up Lewis Hamilton equalled the record for most Formula One podiums (155), previously accomplished by Michael Schumacher.

Background

Impact of the COVID-19 pandemic 

The opening rounds of the  championship were heavily affected by the COVID-19 pandemic. Several Grands Prix were cancelled or postponed after the planned opening round in Australia was called off two days before the race was due to take place, prompting the FIA to draft a new calendar. When the calendar was redrafted following the pandemic the Hungarian and British Grands Prix had swapped dates with the Hungarian Grand Prix moving to 19 July and the British Grand Prix taking the 2 August date. The early cancellation and indefinite postponements prompted a series of double races. The 70th Anniversary Grand Prix was added to the calendar as a one-off event to ensure confirmation of new events.

There had been doubts over whether Silverstone would be able to host Formula One due to quarantine measures proposed by the British government; hopes were raised again by an apparent intervention by the Prime Minister Boris Johnson encouraging his ministers to give Formula One an exemption for racing to go ahead. The British Government did give approval for Formula One at Silverstone.

The addition to the calendar of the 70th Anniversary Grand Prix on 9 August, also at Silverstone, meant that for the first time in twenty-seven years the United Kingdom hosted two Formula One races in the same season. The last season to have two British races in a season prior to this was the 1993 season when Donington Park hosted the European Grand Prix and Silverstone hosted the British Grand Prix. It was later revealed that Silverstone had offered to hold as many as 12 races in total during the season.

Similarly to the opening three rounds, both the British Grand Prix and the 70th Anniversary Grand Prix were held 'behind closed doors' without spectators. Northamptonshire Police reiterated the importance of fans staying away from Silverstone for public health reasons during the two Grand Prix weekends and that strict measures would be in place to stop unauthorised persons from entering the circuit.

Entrants

The drivers and teams were the same as the pre-season entry list with the only exception being Sergio Pérez, who was replaced by Nico Hülkenberg, as had also been the case at the  seven days earlier. Robert Kubica took part in the first practice session for Alfa Romeo Racing, replacing Antonio Giovinazzi.

It had been widely reported that Pérez would miss the Grand Prix as he tested positive for the coronavirus (which can cause COVID-19) three days before the British Grand Prix, which was in line with the  British government COVID-19 requirements at the time of the race for those who have tested positive to self-isolate for ten days. United Kingdom COVID-19 quarantine rules prior to 30 July (the day of Pérez's negative test) stated that persons must self isolate for seven rather than ten days, meaning Pérez could race in the 70th Anniversary Grand Prix if he returned a negative the Thursday before that race. However, it was reported following qualifying for the British Grand Prix that since Formula One was relying on the goodwill of the relevant authorities to host races, the FIA would demand that Pérez undergo a ten-day isolation period, although no formal announcement was made by Formula One or the FIA on the matter. On 6 August, Racing Point confirmed that this was not the case and that Pérez would be able to race provided he returned a negative coronavirus test. However, Pérez did test positive, and thus Nico Hülkenberg was confirmed to enter instead of him.

Tyre choices 
Pirelli brought the medium hardness range of C2, C3 and C4 compound tyres for teams to use in the race, by contrast the 2020 British Grand Prix held on the same circuit layout the week before saw the hardest available C1, C2 and C3 selection used – the change was made to add strategic interest to the second race and to make sure the teams use the three practice sessions. This came after plans to have a reverse starting grid at the second event were opposed by Mercedes.

The previous race at Silverstone had seen three cars – those of Lewis Hamilton, Valtteri Bottas and Carlos Sainz Jr. – experiencing punctures in the closing stages. Following the race, proposals were made to retain the same tyre compounds for the 70th Anniversary Grand Prix, since the softer compounds planned to be used would be more susceptible to wear and degradation. Pirelli decided to stick to its original selection of the C2, C3, and C4 tyres, albeit with increased minimum tyre pressures stipulated. Furthermore, the planned running of 2021 prototype tyres in the second practice session was scrapped in order to allow teams more time to optimise the running of their race packages (meaning car and tyres) with the new tyre pressure limits.

Practice 
The first practice session passed without incident and ended with Valtteri Bottas fastest ahead of Mercedes teammate Lewis Hamilton and Red Bull's Max Verstappen. The second session ended with Hamilton quickest followed by Bottas and the Renault of Daniel Ricciardo. Towards the end of the session, Sebastian Vettel's Ferrari and Antonio Giovinazzi's Alfa Romeo both suffered engine failures, with the latter bringing out the red flag and ending the session prematurely. The third practice session ran uninterrupted and ended with Hamilton fastest ahead of Bottas and McLaren driver Lando Norris.

Qualifying
Valtteri Bottas took pole ahead of Lewis Hamilton only by 0.064 seconds in the third part of qualifying (Q3) with Nico Hülkenberg qualifying 3rd ahead of Max Verstappen in 4th and Daniel Ricciardo 5th. Both the Mercedes pair (Hamilton and Bottas) and Ricciardo did their best Q3 laps on the medium tyre as opposed to the soft tyre which, in theory, should have been faster. The rest of the top 10 on the grid was Lance Stroll in 6th, Pierre Gasly 7th, Charles Leclerc 8th, Alexander Albon 9th and Lando Norris 10th. Esteban Ocon originally qualified 11th but received a three-place grid penalty for impeding George Russell in the first part of qualifying (Q1). Sebastian Vettel struggled, failing to get through to Q3, only managing 12th fastest in his Ferrari, he was at a loss to explain his lack of performance. Carlos Sainz Jr. was 13th fastest ahead of Romain Grosjean in the Haas while Russell made a 4th successive Q2 appearance this season. Daniil Kvyat was 16th and knocked out after Q1 after having his best lap time deleted for breaching track limits in that session. Rounding out the grid were Kevin Magnussen in 17th, Nicholas Latifi in 18th, Antonio Giovinazzi in 19th and Kimi Räikkönen 20th and last.

Bottas set a new record for most consecutive Q3 appearances. This was the 67th consecutive race in which Bottas has qualified in the top ten, having done so at every race weekend since the 2017 Australian Grand Prix. He surpassed the previous record of 66 consecutive Q3 appearances, set by Hamilton between the 2010 Chinese Grand Prix and the 2013 Belgian Grand Prix.

Qualifying classification 

Notes
  – Esteban Ocon received a three-place grid penalty for impeding George Russell during qualifying.

Race

Race report 

In the race start, Valtteri Bottas and Lewis Hamilton got a clean getaway, with Max Verstappen almost immediately passing Nico Hülkenberg for third. At turn 1, Sebastian Vettel spun, dropping him to last place. Hamilton tried to close up to and overtake Bottas at Copse corner unsuccessfully. Pierre Gasly, who was using the soft compound tyres, pitted on lap 7. Over the next few laps, the drivers using the soft tyres pitted for hards or mediums compound tyres. A few laps later, Mercedes began struggling with their tyres, with the heat accelerating tyre wear and causing blisters. On lap 13, the race leader Bottas pitted, with Hamilton subsequently pitting on the next lap, allowing Verstappen to inherit the lead and race in clean air. Despite Mercedes now having newer tyres, they kept losing time to Verstappen due to heat degradation and blistering. On lap 26, Verstappen pitted for the medium compound tyres. Mercedes' undercut briefly worked with Bottas getting ahead of Verstappen, but Verstappen made quick work of Bottas to retake the lead of the race. 

On lap 31, Daniel Ricciardo spun while trying to race Carlos Sainz Jr. for 12th. Both Verstappen and Bottas made second pit stops for the hard tyres. Charles Leclerc inherited fifth place after Hülkenberg pitted, lapping around the same pace as the leaders. Hamilton pitted on lap 42, to avoid risk of a tyre failure (which happened in the previous race), ending up behind Leclerc. Kevin Magnussen was forced to retire due to a tyre shortage. Hamilton made quick work of passing Leclerc to take third place. Hülkenberg was forced to pit again due to vibrations in his car, dropping him to seventh. Meanwhile, Bottas struggled with pace, falling behind Verstappen, with Hamilton catching up to him. Hamilton got past Bottas on the DRS straight before Brooklands on lap 50. On lap 51, Alexander Albon got past Lance Stroll to take fifth. Verstappen won the race, around 11 seconds ahead of Hamilton.

Race classification 

Notes
  – Includes one point for fastest lap.
  – Kevin Magnussen received a five-second time penalty for leaving the track and rejoining unsafely, but it was unapplied as he retired from the race.

Championship standings after the race

Drivers' Championship standings

Constructors' Championship standings

 

 Note: Only the top five positions are included for both sets of standings.

See also 
 2020 2nd Silverstone Formula 2 round
 2020 2nd Silverstone Formula 3 round

Notes

References 

70th Anniversary
70th Anniversary Grand Prix
70th Anniversary Grand Prix
Anniversaries
Formula One Grands Prix